The Injustice Society (a.k.a. the Injustice Society of the World) is a group of supervillains in the . They are the main antagonists of the Justice Society of America.

The Injustice Society first appears in All Star Comics #37 (Oct 1947) and was created by Sheldon Mayer and Bob Kanigher. The original group brought together six popular villains from Flash Comics, Green Lantern and All Star Comics: the Thinker, the Gambler, Vandal Savage, the Wizard, Per Degaton and Brain Wave.

The Injustice Society appear on the DC Universe and CW show Stargirl as the main antagonists of the first season, with some members also appearing in its second season.

Fictional team history

Golden Age

The Wizard's Injustice Society
It is unknown under what circumstances the Injustice Society was formed. The group first appeared in the second half of the 1940s where they were led by the Wizard and planned to take over America. Fragmenting into individual efforts, the ISW launched strikes against government facilities around the nation, each with his own private army of convicts due to five jailbreaks engineered by the ISW. In addition to furthering their primary aims, the villains were each assigned to capture a member of the JSA in anticipated resistance. To ensure that the JSA showed up, the villains notified the heroes of their plans. In due course, Hawkman was captured by Vandal Savage at an airport which the criminal army had surrounded. Doctor Mid-Nite was apprehended by Per Degaton who was attacking the Washington Monument. The Flash fell victim to his long-time foe the Thinker at the Governor's house where the Thinker was broadcasting fake demands by the Governor to make the armed forces stand down due to invisible wires. The Atom was snared by the Gambler. Green Lantern arrives in Uthorium Town just as the armed forces are closing in on the criminals that control the city. Suddenly, the town disappears in a flash of light. Green Lantern begins a search for the criminal army when he discovers the town has re-appeared a few miles away, and the felons are looting uthorium from a lab. Green Lantern zooms in for the attack when Brainwave appears on the scene, opening a canister of uthorium in his presence. Blinded, Green Lantern forms an energy bubble for protection while Brainwave and his men finish their job. Recovering later, Green Lantern discovers a radioactive trail left behind by the uthorium and follows it, discovering some of the thugs with an invention called the "Mirage-Thrower," which fools the Army tanks into crossing a frozen lake which really isn't frozen. Green Lantern saves the tanks and men, then follows the trail to discover Brainwave inside a weird glass box. Firing his power ring at it, the ray bounces back, knocking Green Lantern off a cliff, apparently to his death. Hearing of Per Degaton's capture of Doctor Mid-Nite in Capital City (evidently meant to be based on Washington), Wonder Woman and Johnny Thunder left JSA headquarters to intervene, only to be captured themselves. The JSA were held by a will-deadener beam, put on "trial" before Judge Thinker with the Wizard as Prosecutor. The JSA were sentenced to death, but it was then revealed Green Lantern had disguised himself as the Thinker. His ring saved him at the last moment and he captured the Thinker. He freed the others and they defeated the Injustice Society, with the Wizard being caught by a group of children who idolized the Justice Society called the Junior Justice Society.

Second Injustice Society
The second formation appeared in the late 1940s attempting "patriotic crimes" where it was formed by Wizard and consisted of Fiddler, Harlequin, Huntress, Icicle, and Sportsmaster. They stole national monuments, hoping the American people would vote for the best crime allowing that person to become the leader, and succeeding in erasing the Society's memories after capturing them by the Sportsmaster knocking them out with one of his bombs, but Harlequin turned against them and with Black Canary restored the Justice Society's memories, though a post-hypnotic impulse restores the JSA to their mindless states when they hear fingers snapping, causing them to be recaptured. But their memories are restored again after they are placed in a death chamber, leading to Black Canary becoming a proper member.

Silver Age
The Injustice Society reforms during the 1970s to eliminate the reformed Justice Society. First, the Fiddler fetches Solomon Grundy and defeats Wildcat and Hawkman, but they are defeated by Kal-L and Power Girl. Vandal Savage tricks the JSA into aiding a false Camelot while the Icicle, the Thinker, the Wizard, and Brainwave capture Wildcat and the Hourman. The Thinker and the Icicle are defeated by Doctor Fate, Hawkman, and Jay Garrick, while the Wizard and Brainwave are defeated by Power Girl and the Star-Spangled Kid. The Wizard then left the Injustice Society for Earth-One, where he joined the Secret Society of Super-Villains. Brainwave captures Green Lantern, Jay Garrick, and Power Girl before being defeated in Power Girl's first solo adventure.

Post-Crisis

Injustice Unlimited
During what some described as the "anti-costumed-hero mania" (as chronicled in the DC miniseries Legends) in the pages of Infinity, Inc., the Wizard gathered both old comrades (consisting of Brainwave, the Fiddler, the Gambler, the Harlequin, Per Degaton, the Shade, Solomon Grundy, the Sportsmaster, the Thinker, and Vandal Savage) and new super-criminals (consisting of Hazard, the Icicle II, and the Tigress III) into a new Injustice Society, which he called "Injustice Unlimited". Infinity, Inc. fought Injustice Unlimited, which led to the apparent death of the Wizard. Indeed, the criminal group seemed to be a mirror image of Infinity, Inc., which itself was an offshoot of the Justice Society, at the time when the group was led by the Dummy. Later, this team returned to the original name.

Johnny Sorrow's Injustice Society
Johnny Sorrow appears in late 1999 as the leader of the new Injustice Society (consisting of the Icicle II, Blackbriar Thorn, Count Vertigo, Geomancer, Killer Wasp, and the Tigress III). Together they storm the headquarters of superhero team Justice Society of America, although JSA member Wildcat defeats them all (destroying Blackbriar Thorn) despite still recovering from a broken arm and the attack initially being launched while he was in the bathtub, with the exception of Sorrow, who uses the diversion to steal an unknown artifact.

Sorrow returns with a larger version of the Injustice Society (having also recruited Black Adam after removing a brain tumour, Shiv, the Rival, and the Thinker A.I.) to distract the JSA while he summoned the King of Tears, an other-dimensional entity. However, the JSA were able to fend off the Society, including killing the Rival and Black Adam defecting, with the fight culminating in the Flash drawing on Black Adam's speed to send the King of Tears to another dimension by striking him at near-lightspeed.

The Wizard's second Injustice Society
The demon Legacy (actually the Wizard in disguise) formed another version in the miniseries JSA All-Stars. The lineup consists of the Icicle II, the Rival, Shiv, and the Tigress III. The new team again confronted the JSA. Unknown to the JSA, their job was just to stick teleportation discs to the old-timers. Legacy then teleported his successful team away. Legacy is then later "killed" by the Spectre.

Johnny Sorrow's Injustice Society
The Injustice Society resurfaced again in November 2005, in the pages of JSA Classified. The soul of the Wizard joined forces with Johnny Sorrow where they gathered a new incarnation of the Injustice Society consisting of the Gentleman Ghost, the Icicle II, the Rag Doll I, Solomon Grundy, the Thinker A.I., and the Tigress III. They were tasked to steal Prometheus' Cosmic Key from JSA headquarters in order to free the Wizard and Johnny Sorrow. While noting to himself that the Rag Doll I would betray the group, the Wizard sets him up to take the fall. The Injustice Society tried to enlist the Secret Society of Super Villains to help with the caper, which drew the attention of Talia al Ghul. The Rag Doll I took the Cosmic Key as the Wizard had predicted and was killed when he activated it. Once Johnny Sorrow was brought back to Earth, he and the Injustice Society teleported to Prometheus' Crooked House. When it was discovered that the Tigress III and the Icicle II had started to fall in love with each other, Johnny Sorrow strong-armed them into sticking around.

Another plot was to kidnap Stargirl and to face off against the JSA All Stars.

DC Rebirth
In 2016, DC Comics implemented another relaunch of its books called DC Rebirth, which restored its continuity to a form much as it was prior to The New 52. Hawkman and Hawkgirl recount their time with the Justice Society and the day that they fought the Injustice Society. In the flashback to the 1940s when the Justice Society stormed the Injustice Society's fortress in Austria, Hawkman fought Per Degaton, Hawkgirl fought Vandal Savage, Green Lantern fought the Wizard, the Sandman fought the Gambler, Wildcat fought the Tigress, and the Flash fought Brain Wave. After Brain Wave unleashes a powerful psychic attack that knocks everyone down, Per Degaton and Vandal Savage prepare to finish off Hawkman and Hawkgirl. Hawkman and Hawkgirl throw their maces enough for them to collide. This enables the Justice Society to turn the tables against the Injustice Society. Green Lantern then makes an airplane construct so that the Justice Society can deliver the Injustice Society to the authorities.

Membership

Original team
 the Wizard (William Zard) - An illusionist and powerful sorcerer.
 Brain Wave I (Henry King Sr.) - A metahuman with great psionic powers.
 the Gambler (Steven Sharpe III) - A master of disguise and weapons.
 Per Degaton - A time-traveler with access to advanced technology.
 the Thinker (Clifford DeVoe) I - A former district attorney and enemy of the Flash.
 Vandal Savage - A ruthless caveman given immortality thousands of years ago.

This formation included the following additional members:

 the Fiddler (Isaac Bowin) - A criminal who uses specially-made violins.
 the Sportsmaster (Lawrence Crock) - A crook who uses sport-themed weapons.
 the Tigress II (Paula Brooks) - A tiger-themed mercenary, married to the Sportsmaster.
 the Icicle I (Joar Mahkent) - A scientist who invented a gun that drastically lowers temperature.
 the Harlequin I (Molly Mayne) - A villainess with hypnotic goggles.

Later members
 the Shade (Richard Swift) - He was an additional member when a third formation formed during a team-up between the Justice Society and the Justice League, but later in the comic Starman (vol. 2), he is shown in a flashback assisting a Golden Age incarnation of the Society. His actual time of joining is unknown, but he was a member during the Golden Age. He had a cane which enabled him to cast darkness.
 Solomon Grundy - A superstrong undead foe of Green Lantern who joined a fourth formation led by the Icicle.

Injustice Unlimited members
 the Wizard
 the Fiddler
 the Shade
 the Tigress III (Artemis Crock) - Daughter of the Tigress I and the Sportsmaster.
 Hazard - Granddaughter of Gambler.
 the Icicle II (Cameron Mahkent) - Son of the Icicle I with cryokinetic powers.

Later members
These members were recruited after the Wizard was believed dead and both the Fiddler and the Shade were imprisoned.

 the Dummy - A sentient ventriloquist's dummy and enemy of the Vigilante who became the second leader of Injustice Unlimited.
 the Harlequin II (Marcie Cooper)
 Solomon Grundy

Johnny Sorrow's team

 Johnny Sorrow - A former thief whose face kills nearly anyone who looks at it.
 Count Vertigo - A Green Arrow villain who induces vertigo.
 the Icicle II (Cameron Mahkent)
 Geomancer I (Adam Fells) - A geokinetic supervillain.
 the Tigress III (Artemis Crock)
 Blackbriar Thorn - A Druid.
 Killer Wasp - A half-human, half-insect villain who is the son of the Yellow Wasp.

Later recruits included:

 the Rival - A foe of the Golden Age Flash who developed a formula to endow himself with speed nearly matching that of the Flash.
 Black Adam - A rogue Marvel Family member with powers from the Egyptian Gods. He was sent after Wildcat, but betrayed the team.
 Shiv - Shiv is the daughter of the supervillain Dragon King. She had a grudge against Stargirl.
 the Thinker II (A.I.) - An artificial intelligence version of the Thinker I which spied on the JSA.

Legacy's team
 Legacy - This is an alias of the Wizard.
 the Kestrel - A supervillain created by M’Shulla and Gorrum of the Lords of Chaos to either subvert the Hawk (of the Hawk and the Dove) to the forces of evil or to kill him.
 the Rag Doll I - A contortionist supervillain.
 the Tigress III (Artemis Crock)
 the Icicle II (Cameron Mahkent)
 Solomon Grundy
 Shiv

Present formation

The Injustice Society resurfaced again in November 2005 in the pages of JSA Classified, composed of:

 the Icicle II (Cameron Mahkent)
 the Tigress III (Artemis Crock)
 the Rag Doll I (Peter Merkel, deceased)
 the Thinker II (A.I.)
 Solomon Grundy
 the Wizard
 the Gentleman Ghost - The ghost of a highwayman.
 Johnny Sorrow

The Injustice Society resurfaced once more, this time in a plot to kidnap Stargirl and to face off against the JSA All Stars. The team was composed of the following members:

 Johnny Sorrow
 the Tigress III (Artemis Crock)
 the Icicle II (Cameron Mahkent)
 the Wizard
 Killer Wasp
 Geomancer II - The unnamed successor of Geomancer I with the same abilities.
 Shiv

DC Rebirth version
 the Wizard
 Brain Wave
 the Gambler (Steven Sharpe III)
 the Huntress (Paula Brooks)
 Per Degaton
 Vandal Savage

Other versions

JSA: The Golden Age
In the four-part Elseworlds story JSA: The Golden Age, the Injustice Society appears in a cameo during the final issue. The lineup consists of the Fiddler, the Gambler, the Harlequin, and the Psycho-Pirate. The group is seen at a gathering of superheroes, having apparently taken advantage of a recent offer of amnesty to supervillains willing to serve the U.S. government.

Earth 3
On Earth 3, the Injustice Society is the name of  a supervillain group that is led by Sky Tyrant (Earth 3's version of Hawkman) and other unseen members where it is the evil counterpart of the Justice Society of America. The group was defeated by the Justice Society All-Stars.

In other media
 A team based on the Injustice Society called the Injustice Guild of America appeared in the Justice League two-part episode "Legends", consisting of the Music Master, the Sportsman, Doctor Blizzard, and Sir Swami.
 The Injustice Society appears in the first season of Stargirl, consisting of the Icicle, Brainwave, the Gambler, the Sportsmaster, the Tigress, the Wizard, the Dragon King, and Solomon Grundy, with the Fiddler and the Shade appearing as former members. In the pilot episode, Brainwave, the Gambler, the Icicle, the Shade, Grundy, the Sportsmaster, the Tigress, and the Wizard attacked the Justice Society of America in Blue Valley and killed most of its members, with the Icicle fatally wounding their leader Starman. A decade after their victory, the Injustice Society operate in Blue Valley under their civilian identities while the Fiddler's wife Anaya Bowin fills in for him. After Courtney Whitmore finds Starman's Cosmic Staff and forms a new Justice Society, the Injustice Society take up arms to stop her as well as enact Project: New America to brainwash the Central United States' citizens. However, the new Justice Society, the Shining Knight, Barbara Whitmore, and Mike Dugan foil their plans, with most of the Injustice Society either being killed, incarcerated, or escaped.
 In the second season, Cindy Burman and Eclipso form their own offshoot group called Injustice Unlimited, recruiting the Sportsmaster and the Tigress' daughter Artemis Crock and the Fiddler's son Isaac Bowin to their cause. After failing to recruit the Icicle's son Cameron Mahkent, Injustice Unlimited fights Stargirl's JSA. In the process, Stargirl accidentally frees Eclipso of his Black Diamond. He subsequently sends Burman to the Shadowlands and consumes Isaac while Artemis flees.

References

Comics characters introduced in 1947
DC Comics supervillain teams
Earth-Two
Golden Age supervillains